Dar Runga was a sultanate in what is today southern Chad. It was a tributary state of the Ouaddai Empire. It was conquered by Rabih az-Zubayr in 1890 and annexed to its former vassal, the sultanate of Dar al Kuti.

References 
 Traditional Rulers in the Central African Republic

2nd millennium in Chad